A BBC Programme Identifier (PID) is an alphanumeric, persistent, unique identifier for a television or radio programme brand, a season or series, or an individual episode, used by the BBC in their web URLs, iPlayer viewers, and internal databases.

All PIDs consist of a lower-case letter, followed by seven or more other characters which may be lower case letters, or digits. Vowels (a, e, i, o, u) are not used, so that offensive words cannot be generated inadvertently. The first letter "b" means the content reference identifier (CRID) authority is Red Bee; a "p" means that the authority is the BBC's Programme Information Pages database, (PIPs). An "s" is used internally, for PIDs identifying partners and suppliers. Other sources, denoted by different opening letters, could potentially be introduced.

For example, the PID for the series The Life Scientific is b015sqc7 while the PID for the individual episode of that show first broadcast on 8 July 2014 is b048l0g3 which is used in its URL, https://www.bbc.co.uk/programmes/b048l0g3.

PIDs have been created retrospectively, for some programmes from the pre-digital era. An example, in the "p" range, is the PID for the 1956 Desert Island Discs episode featuring Ada Cherry Kearton, p009y95q.

Most PIDs have eight characters, but in the past, some World Service programmes were given eleven-character PIDs, starting with "w"; an example is wcr5dr3dnl3.

The BBC encourages viewers and listeners to machine tag media relating to programmes, on social sites such as Flickr, and their own blog posts, using the relevant PID, in the format bbc:programme=b048l0g3.

PIDs are also used to identify BBC programmes, in Wikidata.

References

External links 

 Description of use of PIDs in linked data
 Article on the development of PIDs
 2004 post explaining thinking behind BBC URL structure
 BBC Programmes and Music on the Linking Open Data Cloud - 2008 Presentation on SlideShare by Patrick Sinclair, Content Producer at the BBC
 Linked Data on the BBC - 2009 Presentation on SlideShare by Patrick Sinclair, Content Producer at the BBC

BBC
Identifiers